Christopher Lee Kattan (born October 19, 1970) is an American actor and comedian. First breaking through as a performer with the Los Angeles comedy troupe The Groundlings, Kattan found wider success during his tenure as a cast member on the NBC sketch comedy series Saturday Night Live from 1996 to 2003. He also played Doug Butabi in A Night at the Roxbury, Bob on the first five seasons of The Middle and Bunnicula in Bunnicula.

Early life
Kattan was born in Culver City, California. His father, Kip King ( Jerome Kattan; 1937–2010), was born to Jewish parents from Iraq and Poland and worked as an actor and voice artist. His mother, Hajnalka Biro (born 1944), was once photographed for Playboy and worked as a model in London. She is a native of Budapest, Hungary and is a Buddhist. His stepfather was a Buddhist therapist and monk. His half-brother, Andrew Joslyn, is a professional musician and composer. 

Kattan was raised on a Zen retreat on Mount San Antonio, outside Los Angeles. He and his mother moved to Bainbridge Island, Washington, where he attended Bainbridge High School, graduating in 1989.

Career

Kattan was a member of several improvisational comedy (improv) and sketch comedy troupes, one of them being The Groundlings in Los Angeles. His father was an original member of the troupe. Kattan also did some minor roles on TV, including the second episode of the second season of NewsRadio, "No, This Is Not Based Entirely on Julie's Life", as a photo shop employee.

He moved to New York City to work on Saturday Night Live from 1996 to 2003. His recurring characters included Mr. Peepers, Mango, Azrael Abyss, Kyle DeMarco from The DeMarco Brothers, Gay Hitler, and, most notably, one half of the Butabi Brothers with fellow SNL (and Groundlings) cast member Will Ferrell, known for their trademark head-bobbing. Kattan and Ferrell continued the characters in the 1998 film, A Night at the Roxbury.

SNL celebrity impersonations

Clay Aiken
Christiane Amanpour
Antonio Banderas
Andy Dick
Larry Fine
Bill Gates
Ben Affleck
David Gest
Elián González
Anne Heche
Julio Iglesias Jr.
Steve Irwin
Chris Kirkpatrick
Ricky Martin
Al Pacino
Kid Rock
David Lee Roth
Paul Shaffer
David Spade
Kerri Strug (also appeared in Weekend Update with Strug as her fictional brother, Kippy)
Geraldo Rivera
Robert Downey Jr.
Anthony Fauci

2007–2017: Post-SNL work
Kattan appeared in a Diet Pepsi Max commercial during Super Bowl XLII in 2008 that featured the song What Is Love and had many actors in the commercial performing the head bob from A Night at the Roxbury.

In August 2009, Kattan starred in the Independent Film Channel (IFC) miniseries Bollywood Hero, where he portrays himself and the difficulties he faces after a career as a comic actor, trying to attain leading man status. Starting in late 2009, Kattan appeared in a supporting role in The Middle. Kattan played Bob, a colleague of Frankie Heck's at Mr. Ehlert's car dealership. Kattan appeared in an episode of How I Met Your Mother as a star in "The Wedding Bride", a fictional movie within the show. He played himself portraying Jed Mosely, the film's villain, which the screenwriter bases on his girlfriend's ex-fiancé, series protagonist, Ted Mosby. He reappeared as the character in the fictional film's sequel, Wedding Bride 2. On December 17, 2011, Kattan made a guest appearance on the Saturday Night Live Christmas show, hosted by Jimmy Fallon, and again briefly on the final episode of SNL's 37th season.

In June 2014, Kattan reprised his role as former SNL character Mango in a preview of the music video for Sharaya J's "Shut It Down", featured in a fashion campaign by Alexander Wang.

In 2017, Kattan was a contestant on season 24 of Dancing with the Stars paired with professional dancer Witney Carson. He was the first celebrity dancer eliminated.

Kattan reunited with fellow SNL alumni Jimmy Fallon, Horatio Sanz, and Tracy Morgan during the December 18, 2018 cold open of The Tonight Show Starring Jimmy Fallon, which also featured Ariana Grande, in a reprisal of their performance of "I Wish it Was Christmas Today". It was the first time since 2011 that Fallon, Sanz, Kattan, and Morgan were all present for a performance of the song.

In 2022, Kattan was announced as a HouseGuest competing on the third season of Celebrity Big Brother.

Personal life

Kattan married model Sunshine Deia Tutt on June 28, 2008, in Oakhurst, California, after proposing to her on Christmas Eve 2006. The couple separated on August 10, 2008, and divorced in February 2009.

Neck injury 
Kattan competed in Dancing with the Stars in 2017, and was criticized for his stiff upper body movement by the Dancing judges. Afterward, Kattan revealed that he had broken his neck doing a stunt 14 years prior and that the injury and subsequent surgeries were the reasons for his lack of mobility. Kattan also revealed that the pain medication he began taking following his fourth surgery led to a 2014 DUI arrest. Kattan revealed more details of the injury in his memoir claiming that it was the result of a SNL sketch, in which he threw himself backwards on a chair while doing a Golden Girls parody, adding that NBC paid for two of five surgeries to repair the spinal injuries.

Filmography

Film

Television

Awards and nominations

References

External links

1970 births
20th-century American male actors
21st-century American male actors
American people of Hungarian descent
American people of Iraqi-Jewish descent
American people of Polish-Jewish descent
American male comedians
American male film actors
American male television actors
Living people
Male actors from California
Male actors from Washington (state)
American Zen Buddhists
American Buddhists
American sketch comedians
People from Bainbridge Island, Washington
People from Culver City, California
Comedians from California
20th-century American comedians
21st-century American comedians
21st-century American Buddhists
Participants in American reality television series